The men's coxless pair competition at the 1960 Summer Olympics took place at took place at Lake Albano, Italy.

Competition format

This rowing competition consisted of three main rounds (heats, semifinals, and final), as well as a repechage round that allowed teams that did not win their heats to advance to the semifinals. All races were 2,000 metres in distance.

 Heats: Four heats. With 19 boats entered, there were to be five boats per heat except the last heat, which was scheduled to have four boats but had only three start. The winner of each heat advanced directly to the semifinals, all other boats went to the repechage.
 Repechage: Four heats. With 14 boats racing in but not winning their initial heats, there were three or four boats per repechage heat. The top two boats in each repechage heat advanced to the semifinal, with the remaining boats eliminated.
 Semifinals: A total of 12 boats reached the semifinals (4 from the heats, 8 from the repechage). They were divided into two semifinals of six boats each. The top three boats in each semifinal advanced to the final, the fourth through sixth place boats were eliminated.
 Final: The final consisted of the remaining six boats.

Results

Heats

Heat 1

Heat 2

Heat 3

Heat 4

Hungary was entered in this heat, but did not start.

Repechage

Repechage heat 1

Repechage heat 2

Repechage heat 3

Repechage heat 4

Semifinals

Semifinal 1

Semifinal 2

Final

References

Rowing at the 1960 Summer Olympics